Luciana Corsato-Owsianka (born 21 January 1966) is a former professional tennis player from Brazil.

Biography
Corsato began competing on the professional tour in 1984.

Her best performance in a grand slam tournament was a second round appearance at the 1988 French Open, which she competed in as a lucky loser from qualifying.

In 1989 she was a doubles finalist at the WTA Tour event in Guaruja and made the quarter-finals of the singles at Taranto.

She had her best WTA Tour result in singles at São Paulo in 1990, when she made it through to the semi-finals, in a run which included a win over top seed Eva Švíglerová.

As a member of Brazil's Fed Cup team she featured in a total of seven ties. In a World Group play off tie against Argentina in 1991 she won her only singles match, over Patricia Tarabini.

Later settling in Germany, Corsato married local tennis coach Marek Owsianka.

WTA Tour finals

Doubles (0-1)

ITF finals

Singles (2–3)

Doubles (2–2)

References

External links
 
 
 

1966 births
Living people
Brazilian female tennis players
Brazilian emigrants to Germany
Tennis players at the 1983 Pan American Games
Pan American Games competitors for Brazil
21st-century Brazilian women
20th-century Brazilian women